Ballajora Quarry Halt (Manx: Stadd Wharral Valley Joaree) is an intermediate stopping place on the northerly section of the Manx Electric Railway on the Isle of Man.

Route

Also
Manx Electric Railway Stations

References

Sources
 Manx Manx Electric Railway Stopping Places (2002) Manx Electric Railway Society
 Island Island Images: Manx Electric Railway Pages (2003) Jon Wornham
 Official Tourist Department Page (2009) Isle Of Man Heritage Railways

Railway stations in the Isle of Man
Manx Electric Railway
Railway stations opened in 1908
1908 establishments in the British Empire